Klimovka is a rural locality (a village) in Zirgansky Selsoviet, Meleuzovsky District, Bashkortostan, Russia. The population was 20 as of 2010. There is 1 street.

Geography 
Klimovka is located 32 km north of Meleuz (the district's administrative centre) by road. Yumakovo is the nearest rural locality.

References 

Rural localities in Meleuzovsky District